Slađana Erić (born 29 July 1983) is a Serbian volleyball player. She plays for ŽOK Partizan Vizura.

Clubs
 OK Crvena Zvezda  2000–2004
 USSP Albi  2004–2005
 VBC Voléro Zurich  2005–2008
 CAV Murcia 2005  2008–2010
 OK Crvena Zvezda  2010–2011
 Universal Modena  2011
 Galatasaray Medical Park  2011–2012
 OK Kolubara  2012–2013
 ŽOK Partizan Vizura  2013–2018
 Liu Jo Nordmeccanica Modena  2018

Awards

 Championship of Serbia
 Winner : 2002, 2003, 2004. (OK Crvena Zvezda), 2014. (ŽOK Partizan Vizura)
 Serbian Cup 
 Winner : 2002. (OK Crvena Zvezda)
 Serbian Super Cup 
 Winner : 2013. (ŽOK Partizan Vizura)
  Switzerland Super CUP 
 Winner : 2006. (VBC Voléro Zurich)
  Championship of Switzerland 
 Winner : 2006, 2007, 2008. (VBC Voléro Zurich)
  Switzerland Cup 
 Winner : 2006, 2007, 2008. (VBC Voléro Zurich)
Championship of Spain 
 Winner : 2009. (CAV Murcia 2005)
Spanish Cup  
 Winner : 2009, 2010. (CAV Murcia 2005)
 Spanish Super Cup 
 Winner : 2009. (CAV Murcia 2005)
 Women's CEV Cup 
 Runner–up : 2012. (Galatasaray Medical Park)

References

Player profile at CEV website

1983 births
Living people
Serbian women's volleyball players
Galatasaray S.K. (women's volleyball) players
Sportspeople from Tuzla
Serbian expatriate sportspeople in Spain
Serbian expatriate sportspeople in Switzerland
Serbian expatriate sportspeople in Italy
Serbian expatriate sportspeople in Turkey
Serbian expatriate sportspeople in France

Serbs of Bosnia and Herzegovina